The year 1939 in television involved some significant events.
Below is a list of television-related events during 1939.



Events
March 4 – The BBC Television Service broadcasts one of the first television plays specially written for the medium, Condemned To Be Shot by R. E. J. Brooke, live from its London studios at Alexandra Palace. The production is notable for the use of a camera as the first-person perspective of the play's unseen main character.
March 27 – The BBC broadcasts the entirety of Magyar Melody live from His Majesty's Theatre in London. The 175-minute broadcast is the first showing of a full-length musical by television.
April 
Television demonstrations are held at the 1939 New York World's Fair on Long Island and the Golden Gate International Exhibition in San Francisco.
RCA, General Electric, Dumont and others begin selling television sets to the public in the New York City area. Screen sizes typically range from 5 to 12 inches, and Dumont features 14-inch and 16-inch models.  Prices start at $200 and go as high as $1000. 
April 30 – Franklin D. Roosevelt, appearing at the opening ceremony of the 1939 New York World's Fair, becomes the first President of the United States to give a speech that is broadcast by television.
May 17 – The first baseball game (Princeton University vs. Columbia University) is broadcast by television, from Baker Field in New York. Bill Stern is the announcer.
May 19 – The Walt Disney cartoon Donald's Cousin Gus airs on NBC's experimental station W2XBS (later WNBC-TV) in New York. This marks the first movie cartoon to be televised in the United States.
June 1 – The first heavyweight boxing match is televised, Max Baer vs Lou Nova, from Yankee Stadium in the Bronx.
August 26
The first Major League Baseball game is telecast, a double-header between the Cincinnati Reds and the Brooklyn Dodgers at Ebbets Field, in Brooklyn, New York.
Poland broadcasts a feature film for the first time—Barbara Radziwiłłówna (1936)—using the experimental transmitter mounted atop the Prudential building in Warsaw.
August 31 – 18,999 television sets have been sold in England before manufacture stops due to World War II.
September 1 – The anticipated outbreak of World War II brings television broadcasting at the BBC in Britain to an end at 12:35 p.m. after the broadcast of a Mickey Mouse cartoon, Mickey's Gala Premier, various sound and vision test signals, and announcements by presenter Fay Cavendish. It is feared that the VHF waves of television would act as a homing signal for guiding enemy bombers to central London: in any case, the engineers of the television service would be needed for the war effort, particularly for development of radar. The BBC would resume its broadcasting, with the same Mickey Mouse cartoon, after the war in 1946.
September 30 – 1939 Waynesburg vs. Fordham football game, the first televised American football game, between college teams Fordham University and Waynesburg College at Randall's Island, New York.
October 22 – The first National Football League game is televised. The Brooklyn Dodgers vs. Philadelphia Eagles at Ebbets Field in Brooklyn.
November 8 – CBS television station W2XAB resumes test transmission with an all-electronic system broadcast from the top of the Chrysler Building in New York City.
November 23 - The earliest known live broadcast of the Macy's Thanksgiving Day Parade is broadcast locally in New York.

Television shows

Programs ending during 1939

Births
January 4 – Burt Sugarman, American film and television producer
January 9 – Susannah York, actress (died 2011)
January 10 – Sal Mineo, actor (died 1976)
January 17 – Maury Povich, talk show host
January 22 – Jeff Smith, American chef and presenter (died 2004)
January 24 – Ray Stevens, American singer
February 2 – Jackie Burroughs, actress (died 2010)
February 6 – Mike Farrell, actor, M*A*S*H
February 9 – Janet Suzman, actress
February 25 – John Leonard, critic
March 3 - Larry Burkett, radio host (died 2003)
March 4 - Robert Shaye, actor
March 5 
Samantha Eggar, actress
Michael A. Krauss, television segment producer
March 9 - Eugene Lee, American set designer (died 2023)
March 13 - Neil Sedaka, singer
March 14 - Raymond J. Barry, actor
March 21 - Kathleen Widdoes, actress
March 24 - Lynda Baron, English actress (died 2022)
March 31 - Israel Horovitz, actor (died 2020)
April 1 - Ali MacGraw, actress
April 2 - Marvin Gaye, singer (died 1984)
April 5 - Roger Davis, actor, Alias Smith and Jones
April 9 - Michael Learned, actress, The Waltons
April 11 – Louise Lasser, actress, Mary Hartman, Mary Hartman
April 13 - Paul Sorvino, actor, Law & Order (died 2022)
April 19 - Ellen Weston, actress, S.W.A.T.
April 23 
David Birney, actor, Bridget Loves Bernie (died 2022)
Lee Majors, actor, The Big Valley, The Six Million Dollar Man, The Fall Guy
April 27 – Judy Carne, actress, comedian, Rowan and Martin's Laugh-In (died 2015)
May 1
Mark Slade, actor, The High Chaparral
Max Robinson, journalist (died 1988)
May 13 – Harvey Keitel, actor
May 25 – Dixie Carter, actress, Designing Women (died 2010)
May 26 – Brent Musburger, sportscaster
May 30 – Michael J. Pollard, actor, (died 2019)
June 1 – Cleavon Little, actor (died 1992)
June 8 – Barry Lando, journalist
June 9 – Dick Vitale, sportscaster
June 19 – John MacArthur, pastor
July 4 - Ed Bernard, actor, Police Woman, The White Shadow, Hardcastle and McCormick
July 10 - Lawrence Pressman, actor, Doogie Howser, M.D.
July 16 - Corin Redgrave, actor (died 2010)
July 31 – Susan Flannery, actress, Days of Our Lives
August 21 - Clarence Williams III, actor, The Mod Squad (died 2021)
August 22 – Valerie Harper, actress, The Mary Tyler Moore Show, Rhoda (died 2019)
August 29 – Joel Schumacher, film director (died 2020)
August 30 
William G. Schilling, actor, Head of the Class (died 2019)
Elizabeth Ashley, actress
September 1 – Lily Tomlin, actress, comedian, Rowan and Martin's Laugh-In
September 5 - William Devane, actor, Knots Landing, 24
September 11 - Tom Cherones, producer
September 13 - Richard Kiel, actor (died 2014) 
September 18 - Fred Willard, actor, comedian (died 2020) 
September 26 - Gerald W. Abrams, American television producer
September 28 - Rudolph Walker, British-Trinidadian actor, EastEnders
September 29 – Larry Linville, actor, M*A*S*H  (died 2000)
September 30 – Len Cariou, actor
October 7 - Clive James, Australian-born writer, television presenter, talk show host and critic (died 2019)
October 27 - John Cleese, English actor and comedian, Monty Python, Fawlty Towers
October 30 - Danny Goldman, actor, The Smurfs
October 31 
Ron Rifkin, actor, Alias, Brothers & Sisters
Tom O'Connor, comedian (died 2021)
November 11 - Denise Alexander, actress, General Hospital
November 15 - Yaphet Kotto, actor, Homicide: Life on the Street (died 2021)
November 19 - Garrick Utley, American television journalist (died 2014)
November 20 - Dick Smothers, actor, comedian, The Smothers Brothers Comedy Hour
November 26 - Mark Margolis, actor
December 27 – John Amos, actor, Good Times 
December 28 - Yehoram Gaon, Israeli actor and singer

References